MGE is a three letter acronym, which may mean:
Dobbins Air Reserve Base (IATA airport code MGE)
Madison Gas and Electric
Mahatma Gandhi Expressway
Medial Ganglionic Eminence, a transitory structure in the development of the nervous system
GM Medium Gasoline Engine
MGE UPS Systems, maker of three-phase uninterruptible power supplies, a subsidiary of Schneider Electric since 2003
MGE Office Protection Systems, maker of single-phase UPSes, bought from Schneider by Eaton Corporation in 2007
Missouri Gas Energy, a natural gas distribution company
Mobile genetic elements
Modular GIS Environment
Machine Gun Etiquette, an album by The Damned

ru:MGE